Richard Wurdack is a retired American soccer player who played professionally in the Major Indoor Soccer League.
 
Wurdack attended St. Louis Community College-Meramec.  In 1976, the Meramec soccer team won the National Junior College champions and finished runner-up in 1977.  In 1978, Wurdack transferred to the University of South Carolina which had just established soccer as a varsity sport.  In 1980, Wurdack turned professional with the Denver Avalanche of the Major Indoor Soccer League.  In 1982, he moved to the Kansas City Comets.

External links
 MISL stats

References

Living people
1957 births
American soccer players
Denver Avalanche players
Kansas City Comets (original MISL) players
Major Indoor Soccer League (1978–1992) players
South Carolina Gamecocks men's soccer players
Association football defenders
Association football midfielders